Colonel Rao Bahadur Thakur Sir Sadul Singh Rathore  (1881 – 23 December 1937), of Bagseu, was a senior administrator in Bikaner State in India.

Son of Thakur Rawat Singh Rathore of Rora, Sadul Singh was appointed Assistant Private Secretary to Maharaja Ganga Singh of Bikaner in 1902, Deputy Revenue and Financial Secretary in 1904, Revenue and Financial Secretary in 1910, Revenue Member of the Bikaner State Executive Council in 1912, and Public Works Minister in 1917. He held the last post until his retirement in 1934, at which time he was also Vice-President of the State Executive Council.

Two years before his death, he was designated as officiating Prime Minister of the State of Bikaner in addition to his other duties, although he declined the substantive post for personal reasons

He accompanied the Maharaja to the Imperial War Conference and Imperial War Cabinet in London in 1917 and to the Versailles Conference in 1918–1919.

Sadul Singh was appointed a Companion of the Order of the Indian Empire (CIE) in the 1920 New Year Honours and was knighted in 1935.

Footnotes

References
Who Was Who

1881 births
1937 deaths
Administrators in the princely states of India
Indian Knights Bachelor
Knights Bachelor
Companions of the Order of the Indian Empire
People from Bikaner